Inanda or eNanda (isiZulu: pleasant place, also possibly, level-topped hill) is a township in KwaZulu-Natal, South Africa that is situated 30 km north-west of the Durban CBD; it forms part of eThekwini, the Greater Durban Metropolitan Municipality.  Populated primarily by Zulu-speaking Black Africans, Inanda Township is the home of John Langalibalele Dube, first president of the African National Congress (ANC), as a residence/base of operations of Mahatma Gandhi, and as birthplace of the syncretic Nazareth Baptist Church

History
Brief Description

Inanda Township is one of the original townships in the EThekwini Metropolitan Municipality. In the 1600s Inanda Township was nothing more than an oasis for the few local Indigenous farmers. Until in the late 1700s when white settlers arrived in the area. Then in the 1800s, Inanda Township was used as a 'Reserve' for Black & uneducated people. In 1936, Indian farmers joined life in Inanda. In 1951, July 7, the then government introduced the Group Areas Act, which meant more and more Black people came to Inanda Township. With no proper infrastructure from town-planning, housing, schools, clinics, roads, sanitation, and no water system. It meant life was downhill for the occupants of the township. Between 1984-1987, there were serious political and racial clashes/riots between the Indian & African communities, which drove away all Indian occupants to nearby areas such as Verulam, KwaZulu-Natal, Phoenix, Durban, and Ottawa, KwaZulu-Natal. Inanda Township found itself greatly ignored by the EThekwini Metropolitan Municipality for a number of years even after South Africa first democratic elections in 1994 in terms of development. In 27 April 1994, Nelson Mandela voted in Inanda Township He was elected as the first Black President of the Republic the same year.

Mafukuzela
 John Langalibalele Dube, nicknamed "Mafukuzela" and his wife Nokutela Dube were born here in the 1870s at an American-run Christian mission station in Inanda. The son of a highborn Zulu pastor, Dube was educated at Oberlin College in the United States.  Upon returning to his native Inanda, Dube began to compose the first of his many thoughtful essays on the history and progress of Africans and founded the first bilingual Zulu/English newspaper, Ilanga laseNatali (The Sun of Natal), in 1903. Throughout his life, Dube was an active, pioneering author of Zulu literature.  He later became a vocal force for Black African advancement and liberation, serving from 1912–1917 as the first president of the South African Native National Congress, which was to evolve into the influential African National Congress.
Inspired by the work of African-American educator Booker T. Washington and his Tuskegee University, Dube and his wife founded several schools in Inanda, including Ohlange High School, Redfern Primary School, and Langalibalele High Primary School.  Dube's home neighborhood in Inanda, Dube Village, now contains numerous memorials to his efforts.

Gandhi and the Phoenix Settlement

In 1903, Mahatma Gandhi, who had resided in nearby Durban since 1893, established a small village-like settlement, Phoenix Settlement, on the northwestern outskirts of Inanda.  Boasting residences, a clinic, a school, and a printing press, Phoenix served for a time as an important home to Gandhi, his family and his followers as they strove to follow a path of social change through passive resistance.  The activist newspaper Indian Opinion, which argued strenuously for the civil rights of Indian South Africans and native Africans, was published here in four languages.

Phoenix Settlement continued to serve as home to a number of residents and activists even after Gandhi's departure in 1914, including his son, Manilal Gandhi.  By the early 1980s, a squatter camp, Bhambayi, occupied most of the area around the Settlement.  In 1985, riots in the camp over apartheid caused heavy damage to Phoenix Settlement's buildings, and the community was largely abandoned until February 2000, when then-President Thabo Mbeki formally committed to its reopening and restoration. It was restored in the same year.

Phoenix Settlement was declared a National Heritage Site by the South African government in 2020.

Nazareth Baptist Church
In 1910, the Zulu mystic and charismatic preacher Isaiah Shembe founded the Nazareth Baptist Church, an African initiated church blending Christianity and indigenous Zulu traditions, in Inanda.  Church doctrine emphasizes abstemious living and the Ten Commandments; its followers, themselves known as "Shembe", ascribe quasi-messianic powers to Isaiah Shembe and his descendants.
The Church has undergone several schisms in the over 100 years since its founding. Most Shembe still hail from KwaZulu-Natal, and the historic and venerated Inanda church headquarters site, ekuPhakameni, remains in use.

Racial Conflict

Between 1978 and 1994 Inanda was the site of violent clashes between the town's African and Indian residents. Much of the town's Indian population moved away from Inanda to nearby Phoenix or Verulam in this period.

Geography
Nearby communities in the province of KwaZulu-Natal, in addition to the major city of Durban, include KwaMashu and Ntuzuma.
Inanda Township occupies an extensive area and is subdivided into multi-sections. These sections are primarily not in the form of letters (like in neighboring Kwamashu), but rather in actual names. The sections include, but not limited, Inanda Newtowns A, B, and C (locally known as Ematendeni), Dube Village, Ezimangweni, White City, Langalibalele, Ohlange, Amaoti, Lindley, Congo (D.R), Amatikwe, Phola, Ngoqokazi, Tafuleni, Ntanda, Emachobeni, Ngcungcwini, Soweto, & Glebe. While there's a great deal of debate whether from Umzinyathi, Manyaseni onwards falls within the Inanda perimeters. It actually doesn't, it falls under the Qadi Area. Be that as it may, the Qadi Area is not yet legally recognised as a 'stand-alone' Area. So the people from Qadi are forced to use Inanda for their post addresses, shopping centres and so forth. The Inanda section of Ohlange has become something of a tourist attraction because of its rich historical connection to the late Dr John Langibalele Dube.

Economy and infrastructure
In terms of economy, Inanda Township boasts the following. On the Northern part of the township is Inanda North Town Centre known as eMtshebheni to the locals. With stores like Shoprite, Checkout, Saverite, Furnco, Pep Store, Buildit, Cashbuild & so forth. There is also the Inanda SAPS Station nearby. On the Southern part of the township is the Dube Village Mall named in honour of the late Dr John Langalibalele Dube. The Mall has the Inanda Post Office, Shoprite & plenty other stores. With franchise restaurants such as KFC & Debonairs Pizza. Also with local entertainment pubs such as Sbu's Lounge (Amatikwe), Under The Moon Exclusive Lounge (Lindley), Zack's Exclusive Lounge (Inanda Glebe) to name a few.

In terms of infrastructure, the township has multiple community health centres. With Inanda CHC Clinic situated on Umshado Rd, Newtown C. Inanda Newtown A & B Clinics, Sivananda Clinic in Ohlange, St. Joseph's Roman Clinic in Amatikwe, Bhekimpilo Clinic in Amatikwe to name a few. There's also the Abalindi Old Age & Orphanage Home in Amatikwe. There are also multiple recreational infrastructures such as Sporting fields with the Dr JL Dube Stadium as the biggest one, Children's Parks and the latest inventions by the EThekwini Metropolitan Municipality of Fitness Parks introduced in townships. There is also the Tafuleni Cemetery Park in Tafuleni Section which is one of the largest cemetery parks in the Ethekwini Metropolitan.

Education
 Amandlakayise Primary School — founded by J.L. Dube
 Inanda Seminary School — independent girls' secondary school, founded in 1869 by the American Board of Commissioners for Foreign Missions
 Langalibalele High Primary School — founded by J.L. Dube
 Ohlange High School — founded by J.L. Dube and his Nokutela Dube as Zulu Christian Industrial School; in 1994, site of the polling place where Nelson Mandela cast his vote in South Africa's first racially integrated national election
 Redfern Primary School — (though in Phoenix) but founded by Dr J.L Dube.
Mvaba High School, Mqhawe High School, Inanda Newtown Comprehensive School, No-7 High School, JG Zuma High School, Intshisekelo High School, Nkosinathi High School and Sithabile High School to name a few.

There is also the Elangeni FET College'''  situated in Ohlange, on Dr Langalibalele Dube Drive. Which is a tertiary college offering Business & Engineering Courses & Qualifications.

Media
Inanda is the headquarters of bilingual (English/Zulu) radio station Inanda FM, which broadcasts throughout KwaZulu-Natal. It also the original home of the Ilanga Newspaper which was founded by John Langalibalele Dube.

Notable residents
John Langalibalele Dube, educator, politician, publisher, editor, novelist and poet. Founder of Ilanga lase Natal & co-founder of Inanda Seminary School & Ohlange High School.He was the founding president of the South African Native National Congress (SANNC), which became the African National Congress. 
Nokutela Dube, first South African woman to found a school. Co-founder of Ilanga lase Natal newspaper, Ohlange Institute and Natal Native Congress (the precursor to the South African Native National Congress). Wife of John Langalibalele Dube
Ndaba Mhlongo, actor and comedian. Husband of actress Mary Twala, brother of musician Busi Mhlongo & father of actor, TV personality & choreographer Somizi Mhlongo
Busi Mhlongo, singer, dancer and composer. Sister of comedian Ndaba Mhlongo & aunt of TV personality Somizi Mhlongo
Mxolisi Kaunda, politician, Mayor of eThekwini Metropolitan Municipality
Bertha Mkhize, teacher, businesswoman, woman's rights activist, anti-apartheid movement activist. Born in Embo, Umkomaas, schooled at Inanda Seminary School & Ohlange High School, and lived most of her life in Inanda.
Zandile Gumede, former Mayor of the eThekwini Metropolitan Municipality, member of Member of the KwaZulu-Natal Provincial Legislature
Makoti Khawula, Anti-apartheid movement activist &  Member of the National Assembly of South Africa for the Economic Freedom Fighters 
Ted Swales, pilot and Second World War hero. He was awarded the Distinguished Flying Cross and posthumously the Victoria Cross.
Sibusiso Khumalo (footballer, born 1989), footballer
Andile Fikizolo, footballer

References

Populated places in eThekwini Metropolitan Municipality
Townships in KwaZulu-Natal